Eglė Šulčiūtė (born August 31, 1985) is a Lithuanian professional basketball player. She plays for USO Mondeville (France) and Lithuania women's national basketball team. She has represented national team in several EuroBasket Women competitions. In 2005, she won in LMKL with Vilniaus Lietuvos telekomas.

Clubs 
 2001-2003: Vilniaus Lintel 118 (LMKL)
 2003-2004: Alytaus Snaigė (LMKL)
 2004-2006: Vilniaus Lietuvos telekomas (LMKL)
 2006-2008: Vilniaus TEO (LMKL)
 2008-2009: Faenzos Faenza (Italia)
 2009-2011: Vigo Celta Indepo (Spain)
 2011-: USO Mondeville (France)
 2012:  Galatasaray Medical Park

References 

http://www.galatasaray.org/basketbol/bayan/haber/12545.php

External links 
 FIBA Europe profile
 Basketnews 

1985 births
Living people
Lithuanian women's basketball players
People from Marijampolė
Guards (basketball)